Anolis casildae, Casilda's anole, is a species of lizard in the family Dactyloidae. The species is found in Panama.

References

Anoles
Endemic fauna of Panama
Reptiles of Panama
Reptiles described in 1991